Callistephus  is a monotypic genus of flowering plants in the aster family, Asteraceae, containing the single species Callistephus chinensis. Its common names include China aster and annual aster. It is native to China and Korea. and it is cultivated worldwide as an ornamental plant in cottage gardens and as a cut flower.

Description
The alternately arranged leaves vary in shape or size. The basal leaves usually fall away before flowering. Leaves around the middle of the stem are a few centimeters long and are borne on winged petioles. The blades have serrated edges. Leaves toward the top may have smooth edges. The large solitary flower head grows at the top of the stem and sometimes on branches. The head is lined with layers of phyllaries, those in the outer layer large and leaflike, measuring up to 3 centimeters long. The inner layer can be purple-tinged. The head contains one or two rings of ray florets, most often in shades of reddish purple. The flowering period is from August to October in the northern hemisphere.

Cultivation
This species has been grown and bred extensively in cultivation. Cultivars are available with flowers of many colors, varying heights, and single and double heads. In the wild, they are purple in color. There are several cultivars with flowers of different colors. Cultivars with flowers of other colors were obtained in particular by hybridization. Cultivated varieties can have ray florets in most any color, including red, pink, blue, purple, and white. They are up to 3.5 centimeters long. There are many yellow disc florets in the center. The fruit is a rough-textured, glandular, purple-mottled cypsela that turns gray with age. It has a pappus composed of one outer layer of reddish scales and two inner layers of white bristles.

It has been in cultivation in Europe since 1728 at the latest. In China, it has been cultivated for 2000 years.

Distribution
This plant is a naturalized species in some areas outside of its native range (Indochina, Europe, North America, Australia, New Zealand, etc.) and can be found on the edges of deciduous forests. It grows at altitudes from 300 to 2700 above mean sea level. As ornamental plant it thrives on fresh, nutrient-rich, easy-humus rich soils in warm humid air conditioning.

Pests and diseases
The plants are susceptible to fusarium wilt, a fungal disease. Some cultivars are more resistant to this than others. Pest insects can include leafhoppers, aphids, blister beetles, and the tarnished plant bug. The plant is also susceptible to mites.

Gallery

References

Astereae
Monotypic Asteraceae genera
Flora of China